Jen Provan (born 3 June 1978) is a Canadian sailor. She competed at the 2004 Summer Olympics and the 2008 Summer Olympics.

References

External links
 

1978 births
Living people
Canadian female sailors (sport)
Olympic sailors of Canada
Sailors at the 2004 Summer Olympics – 470
Sailors at the 2008 Summer Olympics – Yngling
Sportspeople from Toronto